Swynford Stakes is a discontinued Canadian Thoroughbred horse race held annually from 1956 through 2016. It was first run at Greenwood Raceway as a race for horses aged three and older. In 1967 it was moved to Woodbine Racetrack where it was changed to a race for two-year-olds. It received Grade 3 status for 1999 and 2000.

Historical notes
The 1958 Swynford Stakes was won by Nearctic who was a son of the great undefeated runner and one of the most influential sires in history, Nearco. Bred by E. P. Taylor at his Windfields Farm in Ontario, Nearctic would earn 1958 Canadian Horse of the Year honours and induction in the Canadian Horse Racing Hall of Fame. However, Nearctic's most important achievement came when he sired the greatest sire of the 20th Century, the now legendary Northern Dancer.

Jockey Dave Penna won the 1982 edition of the Swynford Stakes aboard Sunny's Halo, a colt who went on to win the 1983 Kentucky Derby. In 2008, the race produced its second Kentucky Derby winner when jockey Chantal Sutherland guided Mine That Bird to a Swynford victory.

The 1997 Belmont Stakes winner Touch Gold ran second to Holzmeister in the 1996 running of the Swynford.

The Swynford Stakes was run at various distances:

At Greenwood Raceway:
 1956 : 6 furlongs
 1957 :  furlongs
 1958-1960 : 7 furlongs
 1961-1966 : 1 mile
 
At Woodbine Racetrack:
 1967-1970 : 5 furlongs 
 1971-1972 :  furlongs
 1973-1975, 2016 : 6 furlongs
 1976-1979 : 5 furlongs
 1980-1985 : 7 furlongs
1986-1995 :  furlongs
1996 to 2015 : 7 furlongs

Records
Speed record: (at distance of 7 furlongs)
 1:23.00 - Holzmeister (1996) (recorded in fractions of 1/5 seconds)
 1:23.02 - Turf War (2007)

Most wins by a jockey:
 5 - Robin Platts (1968, 1971, 1976, 1978, 1992)

Most wins by a trainer:
 6 - Mark E. Casse (1999, 2002, 2007, 2012, 2013, 2014)

Most wins by an owner:
 2 - Lanson Farm (1956, 1960)
 2 - Windfields Farm (1958, 1987)
 2 - Stafford Farms (1976, 1978)
 2 - John C. Oxley (2011, 2012)
 2 - Conquest Stables (2013, 2014)

Winners

*Run in two divisions in 1973.

References

Discontinued horse races
Horse racing in Ontario
Flat horse races for two-year-olds
Recurring sporting events established in 1956
Recurring sporting events disestablished in 1956
Woodbine Racetrack